Belleview Baptist Church is a historic Southern Baptist church at 6658 Fifth Street in Belleview, Kentucky.  It was built in 1903 and added to the National Register in 1989.

The church, organized in 1803, built this building, its fourth, in its centennial year.  The building has a complex entrance/bell tower.

See also
National Register of Historic Places listings in Kentucky

References

Baptist churches in Kentucky
Churches on the National Register of Historic Places in Kentucky
Churches completed in 1903
20th-century Baptist churches in the United States
Churches in Boone County, Kentucky
National Register of Historic Places in Boone County, Kentucky
Southern Baptist Convention churches
1903 establishments in Kentucky